"Worry, Worry" is a song performed by Spanish singer/songwriter Barei, featuring vocals from Spanish rapper Porta. The song was released in Spain as a digital download on 7 July 2017. The song peaked at number 34 on the Spanish Singles Chart.

Background
On 19 June 2017, Barei announced on Twitter that she was bringing out three new songs with different themes. "Worry, Worry" was released in Spain as a digital download on 7 July 2017. It was the third of three song to be released by Barei week-on-week after "Wasn't Me" was released on 23 June 2017 and "Forget It" was released on 7 July 2017.

Lyric video
A lyric video to accompany the release of "Worry, Worry" was first released onto YouTube on 7 July 2017 at a total length of three minutes and twenty-four seconds.

Track listing

Charts

Release history

References

2017 songs
2017 singles